Tangkhul is a Sino-Tibetan language of the Tangkhulic branch, spoken in 168 villages of Ukhrul district, Manipur, India. The term "Tangkhul" is derived from the Meitei language terms, "Tang" meaning "scarce" and "Khul" meaning "village" respectively.
According to another theory, the term "Tangkhul" is derived from "Thankhul", meaning "Than village" in Meitei language.

Phonology

Consonants 

 Stop sounds /p t tʃ k/ may have voiced allophones [b d dʒ ɡ] in free variation.
 /m/ may be heard as [ɱ] when preceding /f/ or /ʋ/.
 /r/ can be heard as [r] or [ɾ] in free variation.

Vowels 

 /i e a u/ can have allophone sounds of [ɪ ɛ ɐ ɯ] in free variation.

References

Tangkhulic languages
Languages of Manipur
Languages of Nagaland